Steven John Thomson (born 23 January 1978) is a Scottish footballer who last played for Conference South side Dover Athletic.

Club career
Thomson, a midfielder, previously played for English clubs Crystal Palace, Peterborough United, Brighton & Hove Albion and Scottish teams Falkirk, where he later became the club captain,  and St. Mirren.

Thomson scored four goals during his spell at Palace. His first strike came against Leicester City in the League Cup in September 1999. The following season, Palace drew Leicester in the League Cup again, and this time Palace emerged victorious 3–0 against the Premier League side and League Cup holders. Thomson will be especially remembered by Crystal Palace fans for the stunning strike he scored in this game. Later that season he scored against Sunderland in the FA Cup before finally scoring his first and only league goal for Palace against Wolverhampton Wanderers in September 2002.

He joined Brighton & Hove Albion on 14 January 2008, making his debut in the 1–1 draw with Huddersfield Town. Thomson left Brighton a year later for 'family reasons' and moved back to Scotland, signing a two-and-a-half-year contract with SPL side St Mirren.

Thomson scored his first goal for St Mirren in the 2–0 away win against Motherwell in April 2009. Thomson scored two goals as St Mirren thrashed Celtic 4–0 on 24 March 2010.

At the close of the 2011–12 season Thomson and his family moved south and relocated to Essex to concentrate on a career away from full-time football. He linked up with former Brighton teammate Nicky Forster now manager of Dover Athletic during pre season and signed for the club. He left Dover after the 2012–13 season, having made 30 appearances. He subsequently joined Aylesbury United but did not make an appearance for the club.

References

External links

Living people
1978 births
Footballers from Glasgow
Scottish footballers
Scottish Premier League players
Crystal Palace F.C. players
Peterborough United F.C. players
Falkirk F.C. players
Brighton & Hove Albion F.C. players
St Mirren F.C. players
English Football League players
Association football midfielders